USS Ruff is a name used twice by the United States Navy for minesweepers;

 , a coastal minesweeper laid down in 1940.
 , a minesweeper commissioned 19 April 1943.

United States Navy ship names